José Aldo Rebelo Figueiredo (born 23 February 1956) is a Brazilian politician and a federal deputy elected by the state of São Paulo. He was President of the Chamber of Deputies of Brazil from 2005 to 2007.

With President Luiz Inácio Lula da Silva in Venezuela and Vice President José Alencar undergoing medical tests in the United States, Rebelo became the first communist to assume the duties of acting president of Brazil on 12 November 2006. His brief period in office lapsed the next day upon Lula's return.

He was the main author of a controversial project to change Brazil's Forest Code introduced in the 1960s. Those changes, lobbied by Brazilian farmers, aimed to extend the areas that can be legally deforested. Although President Rousseff vetoed some parts of the law drafted under Rebelo's leadership and finally passed in May 2012, critics such as the WWF saw the law as a catastrophe for the Amazon forest.

Rebelo was the Minister of Sports from 27 October 2011 until 31 December 2014. He was the Minister of Science, Technology and Innovation from 1 January 2015 to 1 October 2015. He was the Minister of Defense in the cabinet of President Dilma Rousseff from 1 October 2015 to 12 May 2016, when he was replaced by the acting president Michel Temer. He left the Communist Party in August, but then joined the Brazilian Socialist Party in September 2017. On 12 April 2018, he left the Brazilian Socialist Party (PSB) for being against a possible candidacy of the former minister of the Federal Supreme Court (STF) Joaquim Barbosa. Rebelo joined Solidariedade (SD) on the same day. On 26 July 2018, Rebelo officially withdrew his candidacy after the party announced support for Geraldo Alckmin along with other parties in the political center, and the name of Rebelo himself as a running mate of Alckmin was also discarded. On 18 August 2018, he took over as State Secretary of Chief of Staff on Márcio França's government (PSB), who became governor of São Paulo with Alckmin's resignation. In December 2019, he left Solidariedade. In August 2021, he launched himself as a presidential candidate again, besides not being affiliated with any party. In March 2022, Rebelo joined the Democratic Labour Party (PDT).

Football fan, is a declared fan of Palmeiras.

References

External links

 
 
Profile in the Chamber of Deputies

|-

|-

|-

|-

1956 births
Living people
Defence ministers of Brazil
People from Alagoas
Presidents of the Chamber of Deputies (Brazil)
Members of the Chamber of Deputies (Brazil) from São Paulo
Ministers of Science and Technology of Brazil
Brazilian people of Italian descent

Democratic Labour Party (Brazil) politicians
Solidariedade politicians
Communist Party of Brazil politicians
Brazilian Socialist Party politicians
Sports ministers of Brazil